Marquise Copeland (born May 9, 1997) is an American football defensive end who is a free agent. He was signed by the Rams as an undrafted free agent in 2019 following his college football career at Cincinnati.

Professional career
Copeland signed with the Los Angeles Rams as an undrafted free agent following the 2019 NFL Draft on May 14, 2019. He was waived during final roster cuts on August 31, 2019, and signed to the team's practice squad the next day.

Copeland was signed to a reserve/futures contract with the Rams on January 9, 2020. He was waived during final roster cuts on September 5, 2020, and signed to the team's practice squad the next day. He was elevated to the active roster on September 12 for the week 1 game against the Dallas Cowboys, and then reverted to the team's practice squad following the game. He was placed on the practice squad/COVID-19 list by the team on December 22, 2020, and restored to the practice squad on December 26. On January 18, 2021, Copeland signed a reserve/futures contract with the Rams.

On August 31, 2021, Copeland was waived by the Rams and re-signed to the practice squad the next day. He was promoted to the active roster on November 26, 2021. Copeland became a Super Bowl champion when the Rams defeated the Cincinnati Bengals.

References

External links
Los Angeles Rams bio

1997 births
Living people
Players of American football from Cleveland
American football defensive tackles
Cincinnati Bearcats football players
Los Angeles Rams players